Banff was a provincial electoral district in Alberta, Canada, mandated to return a single member to the Legislative Assembly of Alberta using the first past the post method of voting from 1905 to 1909, and again from 1975 to 1979.

History
The Banff electoral district has existed twice, both time for a single election period. Banff was one of the original 25 electoral districts contested in the 1905 Alberta general election upon Alberta joining Confederation in September 1905. The district was carried over from the old Banff electoral district which returned a single member to the Legislative Assembly of the Northwest Territories from 1891 to 1905.

The riding disappeared only one election later when it was merged into the newly formed Rocky Mountain Riding. The second incarnation was when Banff-Cochrane was renamed Banff during the 1975 re-distribution, it was changed back to Banff-Cochrane prior to the 1979 election.

The riding was named after the town of Banff, Alberta and Banff National Park.

Banff representation history

Election results

1905 general election
The first incarnation of the Banff electoral district in Alberta was created in 1905 when Alberta was created into a province separate from the Northwest Territories. The electoral district replaced the old Banff territorial electoral district that had previously been represented in the Legislative Assembly of the Northwest Territories from 1891 to 1905. Banff during that era was defining itself as a destination for tourists due to its natural environment. The electoral district also saw growth as mining camps were springing up forming a fertile pocket for the socialist movement. Howard Douglas would serve as Returning Officer.

The electoral district was hotly contested and the race was closely watched around the province. The electoral district had two well known candidates and political veterans. Charles Wellington Fisher the provincial Liberal candidate had been serving as a Northwest Territories MLA supporting the Haultain government for the old Banff electoral district since winning a by-election on February 4, 1903. He was opposed by Conservative candidate Robert George Brett who had also been a Northwest Territories MLA starting in 1888 and represented the Banff electoral district from its creation in 1891 to 1899.

Brett was a pioneer medical doctor who was heavily involved in the early history of the town of Banff having moved to the site in 1883 and founding a sanitarium.

On election night the results came back; Fisher had defeated Brett by winning a slim 58 majority of the 784 votes cast. The Conservative party was disappointed with the result as the district had been one of their best hopes to pick up.

1975 general election

See also
List of Alberta provincial electoral districts

References

Further reading

External links
Elections Alberta
The Legislative Assembly of Alberta

Former provincial electoral districts of Alberta
Banff, Alberta